This is a list of films produced by Gujarati film industry and in Gujarati language. Narsinh Mehta was the first Gujarati language film, released in 1932.

1930s
 Narsinh Mehta (1932)
Sati Savitri (1932)
Gunsundari (1934)
Ghar Jamai (1935)
Be Kharab Jan / Do Diwane (1936)
Akkal Na Baaradaan (1936)

1940s 

 Ranakdevi (1946)
 Meerabai (1947)
 Gunsundari (1948)
 Kariyavar (1948)
 Vadilona Vanke (1948)
 Jogidas Khuman (1948)
 Nanand Bhojai (1948)
 Vevishal (1949)
 Mangalfera (1949)
 Gada no Bel (1950)
 Kahyagaro Kanth (1950)

1950s 

 Kanyadan (1951)
 Mulu Manek (1955)
 Vidhata (1956)
 Malela Jeev (1956)

1960s
Mehndi Rang Lagyo (1960)
Kadu Makrani (1960)
Chundadi Chokha (1961)
Ghar Deevdi (1961)
Nandanvan (1961)
Hiro Salaat (1961)
Veer Ramwalo (1961)
Jogidas Khuman (1962)
Gharni Shobha (1963)
Akhand Saubhagyavati (1963)
Vanraj Chavdo (1963)
Ramat Ramade Ram (1964)
Panetar (1965)
Kalapi (1966)
Liludi Dharati (1968)
Mare Jaavu Pele Paar (1968)
 Kanku (1969)
Bahuroopi (1969)
Sansarleela (1969)

1970s
 Jigar ane Ami (1970)
 Vidhina lekh (1970)
 Upar Gagan Vishal (1971)
 Jesal Toral (1971)
 Upar Gagan Vishal (1971)
 Gunsundarino Gharsansar (1972)
 Jher To Pidhan Jaani Jaani (1972)
 Raja Bharathari (1973)
 Kadu Makrani (1973)
 Valo Nameri (1973)
 Jay Ranchhod (1973)
 Sheth Sagalsha (1973)
 Janamteep (1973)
 Vala Taro Deshma Danko (1973)
 Ranakdevi (1973)
 Mahasati Savitri (1973)
 Hothal Padmani (1974)
 Kadu Makrani (1974)
 Kunwarbai nu Mameru (1974)
 Harishchandra Taramati (1974)
 Shetal Ne Kanthe (1975)
 Sant Surdas (1975)
 Chundadi No Rang (1975)
 Kanchan Ane Ganga (1975)
 Jogidas Khuman (1975)
 Mena Gurjari (1975)
 Jai Ranchhod (1975)
 Tanariri (1975)
 Bhadar Tara Vehta Pani (1975)
 Shetalne Kanthe (1976)
 Bhaibandhi (1976)
 Chundadino Rang (1976)
 Malavpati Munj (1976)
 Ra'Navghan (1976)
 Veer Mangadavalo (1976)
 Sonbai Ni Chundadi (1976)
 Lakha Loyan (1976)
 Man No Manigar (1976)
 Khamma Mara Veera (1976)
 Santu Rangili (1976)
 Veer Mangdavalo (1976)
Daku Rani Ganga (1976)
 Sonano Suraj (1977)
 Son Kansari (1977)
 Mena Gurjari (1977)
 Manek Thambh (1977)
 Shree Balkrishna Lila (1977)
 Dharti Mata (1977)
 Janam Janam Na Saath (1977)
 Kulvadhu (1977)
 Kariyavar(1977)
 Bhrashtachar Murdabad (1977)
 Mari Hel Utaro Raj (1977)
 Halaman Jethvo (1977)
 Manno Manigar (1977)
 Paiso Bole Chhe (1977)
 Sadavant Savlinga (1977)
 Chundadi Odhi Tara Naam Ni (1978)
 Dada Khetrapal (1978)
 Manek Thumbh (1978)
 Patri Parmar (1978)
 Malavpati Munj (1978)
 Jai Khodiar Maa (1978)
 Man No Manigar (1978)
 Gharsansar (1978)
 Ver Ni Vasulat (1978)
 Visamo (1978)
 Miya Fuski 007 (1978)
 Nari Tu Narayani (1978)
 Amarsinh Rathod (1979)
 Garvo Garasiyo (1979)
 Kunwari Satino Kesari Kanth (1979)
 Lalwadi Phoolwadi (1979)
 Navrang Chundadi (1979)
 Rupli Datanwali (1979)
 Tame Re Champo Ne Ame Kel (1979)
 Bhathiji Maharaj (1979)
 Kashino Dikro (1979)
 Preet Khandani Dhar (1979)
 Gangasati (1979)
 Rang Rasiya (1979)
 Sona Indhoni Rupa Bedlun (1979)
 Suraj Chandrani Sakhe (1979)
 Vahue Vagovya Mota Khorda (1979)
 Veer Pasali (1979)

1980s
 Bhavni Bhavai (1980)
 Lohini Sagaai (1980)
 Jog Sanjog (1980)
 Saurashtrano Sinh - Chhelbhai (1980)
 Chitadano Chor (1980)
 Jivi Rabaran (1980)
 Kesar Kathiyani (1980)
 Koino Ladakvayo (1980)
 Namni Nagarvel (1980)
 Sorathni Padmini (1980)
 Jagya Tyarthi Sawar (1981)
 Amar Devidas (1981)
 Bhav Bhavna Bheru (1981)
 Mehulo Luhar (1981)
 Sheth Jagadusha (1981)
 Vansali Vagi Valamni (1981)
 Sant Rohidas (1982)
 Ma Vina Suno Sansar (1982)
 Parki Thapan (1982)
 Retina Ratan (1982)
 Vachhada Dadani Dikri (1983)
 Rakh Na Ramakda (1983)
 Dholamaru (1983)
 Dharatina Ami (1984)
 Mali Methan (1984)
 Manasaina Diva (1984)
 Machchhu Tara Vaheta Pani (1984)
 Nagmati Nagvalo (1984)
 Sajan Sonalde (1984)
 Meru Malan (1985)
 Malo Naagde (1985)
 Lohi Bhini Chundadi (1986)
 Shetal Tara Oonda Paani (1986)
 Sole Somwar (1988)
 Percy (1989)

1990s
 Prem Bandhan (1991)
 Bhadarne Kanthe (1991)
 Parki Jani (1991)
 Hun Hunshi Hunshilal (1992)
 Manvini Bhavai (1993)
 Oonchi Medina Ooncha Mol (1997)
 Parbhavni Preet (1997)
 Mahisagarna Moti (1998)
 Hu Tu Ne Ramtudi (1998)
 Desh Re Joya Dada Pardesh Joya (1998)
 Dariya Chhoru (1999)
 Pandadu Lilu Ne Rang Rato (1999)
 Man Sayba Ni Mediye (1999)

2000s
 Daldu Chorayu Dhire Dhire(2000)
 Ghar Ghunghat Ne Gharcholu (2000)
Maiyar Ma Mandu Nathi Lagtu (2001)
 Dhudki Taari Maya Laagi (2003)
 Love Is Blind (2005)
Gam Ma Piyariyu Ne Gam Ma Sasariyu (2005)
Muratiyo No. 1 (2005) 
 Ek Var Piyu Ne Malva Aavje (2006)
Muthi Uchero Manas (2006)
 Radha Tara Vina Gamtu Nathi (2007)
Vanechandno Varghodo (2007)
 Better Half (2008)
Maiyar Ma Mandu Nathi Lagtu Part-II (2008)
 Mota Gharni Vahu (2008)
 Dukhda Haro Ma Dashama (2008) 
Dholi Taro Dhol Vage (2008)
Little Zizou (2009)
 Harun Arun (2009)
 Have Mare Hira Nathi Ghasva (2009)
 Swarg Thi Sunder Gujarat (2009)
 Vaagi Kalje Katari Tara Premni (2010)
 Piyu Tara Vina Mane Eklu Lage (2010)

2010s
 Premi Zukya Nathi ne Zukshe Nahi (2011)
 Mohanna Monkiz
 Chaar (2011)
 Veer Hamirji (2012)
 Kevi Rite Jaish (2012)
 Bhale Padharya (2012)
 Neelkanth (2012)
 Saptapadii (2013)
 Happy Familyy Pvt Ltd (2013)
 The Good Road (2013)**
 Bey Yaar (2014)
 Aapne To Dhirubhai (2014)
 Ghar Maru Mandir  (2014)
 Whisky Is Risky (2014)
 Rasiya Tari Radha Rokani Rann Ma (2014)
 Sathiyo Chalyo Khodaldham (2014)
 Kon Halave Limdi Ne Kon Zulave Pipli (2014)

Lists

 List of Gujarati films of 2015
 List of Gujarati films of 2016
 List of Gujarati films of 2017
 List of Gujarati films of 2018
 List of Gujarati films of 2019

2020s

Lists 
 List of Gujarati films of 2020
 List of Gujarati films of 2021
 List of Gujarati films of 2022
 List of Gujarati films of 2023

See also
 Gujarati cinema

References

Bibliography

External links
 Gujarati cinema at the Internet Movie Database

Lists of Gujarati films
Lists of films by language